Doğançay is a small village in Mersin Province, Turkey. It is a part of Mezitli district which is a secondary municipality of Mersin. It is situated in the Taurus Mountains. The population is 150 as of 2018. The main activity of residents is farming and agricultural activities including growing grapes, olive, pear, and almond. The village is famous for its special grapes. Because of the uniqueness of its soil, the grapes become to have a very special taste at the end of the harvest season.

Cultural Activities
With the arrival of spring, the villagers collectively perform folk dances, also cook some traditional meals and distribute it to residents of another villagers or guests from all around Mersin.
During these festivals, they also discuss current political issues and their future plans about farming as well as entertainment.

Fruits and vegetables grown in Doğançay
Grapes are tasty because of the soil. This aspect allow residents to convert it very unique molasses, which is very popular among Turkish, especially in Mediterranean. 
 Other usage area of the grapes is  wine industry. At the beginning of, mostly, September, harvest season completely opens. Grapes turn into wine at considerable rate in the village.

Olive, plum and almond are other products.

Notable people
Nuri Yüce is literature and turcology professor who wrote dozens of articles and books about local languages and other literature topics.
Mustafa Keşli is a poet whose nickname is “Cıncık”. He had gathered his poems in a book and had published it.

References

Villages in Mezitli District